The   Tipu Sultan Shahi Mosque (also known as Tipu Sultan Masjid) is a famous mosque in Kolkata, India named after Tipu Sultan the ruler of Mysore. Located at 185 Dharamtalla Street, the mosque is a relic of architectural and cultural heritage.

Construction

This building was built in 1842 by Prince Ghulam Mohammed, the youngest son of Tipu Sultan.
An identical mosque, which was earlier built in 1835 by him is at Tollygunge. The Ghulam Mohammed Wakf Estate manages the two mosques now.
At first, Ghulam Mohammed used his own money to purchase a land in the central area of Calcutta and Built this mosque in 1842, in memory of his father Tipu Sultan. A news was also published on the occasion of the purchase. This mosque is a relic of the architectural and cultural heritage of Kolkata.

In early 80's Tipu Sultan Masjid was damaged due to constructions works of Kolkata Metro Railway in the Esplanade area. The move was regarded as a highly communal stand of the state govt. Nonetheless, after that, fearing backlash, a committee was formed to repair the mosque. Afterwards, the Mosque was restored with the joint effort of Tipu Sultan Shahi Masjid Protection & Welfare Committee and the Metro Railway.

Background
Tipu Sultan (20 November 1750  – 4 May 1799) was the ruler of Mysore and well known as a scholar and poet. Tipu Sultan Mosque was built here in Calcutta (now Kolkata) by his 11th son Prince Gholam Mohammed. He was the ruler of Mysore but why his youngest son built this mosque in memory of his father, far away from Mysore here in Calcutta. There is a history behind this.

Tipu Sultan, the ruler of the South Indian Deccani Kingdom of Mysore, was engaged in a series of wars with the British East India Company, which had sought trade favours from Tipu at first, and later tried to annex his kingdom by military force. After the last war, with Tipu's death on the battlefield and six years after Tipu's death, the entire family was exiled to Calcutta by the British Government. During that period the capital of Mysore Srirangapatnam was captured by British Army. Son of Tipu Sultan, Gholam Mohammed was a child when arrived in Calcutta. He was a man of varied qualities. He was also involved in many public works and associated with a committee formed for maintenance of roadways and buildings.

Restoration efforts

The Tipu Sultan Shahi Masjid Protection & Welfare Committee was founded in the late 1980s by Seraj Mubarki, Mohammad Sharfuddin,  to inform people about the damage caused to the mosque by the Metro railway. This committee is headed by Sami Mubarki as its chairman.

The committee was established to negotiate with the Kolkata Metro authorities to repair the damage caused by the construction underneath the building. The authorities  agreed to demolish the damaged part of the mosque and rebuild it.

Community relations
The Tipu Sultan Shahi Masjid Protection & Welfare Committee, under the guidance of Janab Sami Mubaraki, the incumbent chairman, continues to play an active role in the daily affairs of the mosque. Committee members raised INR 21,501 for the 2004 Tsunami victims as part of the Prime Minister's Tsunami fund.

The committee went on a five-day hunger strike to seek the intervention of the central government when a Muslim dargah was ruined in Vadodara. The fast was later broken with an initiative by H.E. Honorable Governor Shri. Gopal Krishna Gandhi who offered glass of juice to the fasters and later condemned attacks on Hindu temples in Pakistan and the attacks on Christian missionaries in Orissa and other parts of India.

The mosque's Imam Noor ur Rahmaan Barkati issued a fatwa against India's prime minister Narendra Modi for demonetization in 2016. He was implicated by the police in May 2017 after he refused to remove illegal red beacon from his vehicle and threatened to wage Jihad against India.

See also 
Islamic architecture
Islamic art
Tipu Sultan
Sahn
Timeline of Islamic history

References

External links 

Tipu Sultan Mosque

Mosques in Kolkata
Tourist attractions in Kolkata
Mughal mosques
Religious buildings and structures completed in 1842
Tipu Sultan
Grand mosques